Stokely Mason (born 24 October 1975 in Barataria) is a former football midfielder from Trinidad and Tobago who last played for United Petrotrin.

Career
Mason spent his entire career in Trinidad and Tobago, except for brief spells in Costa Rica and England.

International career
He got 61 caps and scored 4 goals for the national team between 1996 and 2004.

Clubs
 Malta Carib Alcons (1993–1995)
 Joe Public F.C. (1996–2000; 2001; 2002)
 Caledonia AIA Fire (2000; 2005)
 C.D. Saprissa (2001–2002)
 W Connection (2003)
 San Juan Jabloteh (2004)
 North East Stars (2006–2008)
 United Petrotrin (2009)

References

1975 births
Living people
Trinidad and Tobago footballers
Trinidad and Tobago international footballers
Joe Public F.C. players
W Connection F.C. players
San Juan Jabloteh F.C. players
TT Pro League players
Morvant Caledonia United players
North East Stars F.C. players
2000 CONCACAF Gold Cup players
2002 CONCACAF Gold Cup players
Association football midfielders
1998 CONCACAF Gold Cup players